Heart and Soul is the second studio album by singer-songwriter Kathy Troccoli.  This album received a Grammy nomination in 1984, and contains songs written by Michael W. Smith. It featured music popular with CCM, as well as synthpop friendly songs, "I Belong to You", "Holy Holy", and "Hearts of Fire". The album features the songwriting skills of Brown and Debbie Bannister, Amy Grant, Gary Chapman, Michael W. Smith, as well as others. The music is a blend of contemporary pop, synthpop, and gospel music. Heart and Soul climbed to the top 10 on the Billboard Top Christian Albums chart.

Track listing 

 "Long Distance Letter" (Gary Chapman, Tim Marsh, Keith Thomas) – 3:13
 "Yes and Know"  (Chapman, Marsh, Thomas) – 3:55
 "Bittersweetness" (Brown Bannister, Phil Madeira, Michael W. Smith) – 3:54
 "Mighty Lord" (Madeira) – 5:02
 "Open My Eyes" (Pam Mark Hall, M. Smith, Amy Grant) –  4:27
 "Holy, Holy" (Deborah D. Smith, M. Smith, Brown and Debbie Bannister) – 5:01
 "Hearts of Fire" (Billy Sprague, B. Bannister, M. Smith) – 4:00
 "I Belong to You" (James Ward, Mark Gersmehl) – 4:16
 "Island of Love" (Chris Eaton) – 3:54

Charts

Radio singles

Production 
 Producer – Brown Bannister
 Executive Producers – Dan Harrell and Michael Blanton
 Engineered and Mixed by Jack Joseph Puig
 Assistant Engineers – Jim Baird, Don Cobb, Steve Ford and Mike Psanos.
 Mastered by Doug Sax at The Mastering Lab (Los Angeles, California).
 Art Direction and Design – Kent Hunter and Thomas Ryan Studio 
 Photography – Mark Tucker 
 Management – Blanton/Harrell Productions

Personnel 

 Kathy Troccoli – lead vocals
 Keith Thomas – Prophet T8 (1, 6, 7), Yamaha DX7 (1, 6, 7), Rhodes piano (2, 5), Oberheim OB-8 (2, 7), synthesizers (9)
 Shane Keister – additional synthesizers (1–4, 7), acoustic piano (3, 4), synthesizers (5, 8, 9)
 Michael W. Smith – Prophet T8 (2, 3), Yamaha DX7 (2, 3), acoustic piano (5), Yamaha GS2 (6), Moog bass (7)
 Phil Madeira – Yamaha GS2 (4)
 Dann Huff – guitars (1–6, 8, 9), electric guitars (7)
 Mike Brignardello – bass guitar (1–6, 8, 9), bass solo (7)
 Paul Leim – drums 
 Lenny Castro – percussion (1, 3, 5, 7, 9), congas (2)
 Ernie Watts – saxophone (1, 2)
 Terry McMillan – harmonica (4)
 Kathy Burdick – backing vocals (1, 8)
 Thom Flora – backing vocals (1, 6, 8)
 Gary Pigg – backing vocals (1, 6, 7, 8)
 Kim Fleming – backing vocals (2–6)
 Diana Hanna – backing vocals (2, 3, 5, 6)
 Donna McElroy – backing vocals (2–6)
 Chris Harris – backing vocals (4, 6, 7, 9)
 Doug Clements – backing vocals (6)
 Jackie Cusic – backing vocals (6, 7)
 Marty McCall – backing vocals (6)
 Judy Rodman – backing vocals (6)
 Melodie Tunney – backing vocals (6)

References

Kathy Troccoli, "Heart and Soul" liner notes. (Reunion, Word Records, 1984)

External links
 Official web site

1984 albums
Kathy Troccoli albums
Reunion Records albums
Word Records albums